is a district located in Aichi Prefecture, Japan.

As of 1 October 2019, the district had an estimated population of 58,304 and a density of 2,351 persons per km2. The total area is 24.79 km2.

Towns and villages 
 Fusō
 Ōguchi 

Districts in Aichi Prefecture